Robert D. Schuck (September 1, 1917 – February 5, 2003) was a Republican politician who served in the Ohio House of Representatives.  Serving in the U.S. Army Counter-Intelligence Corps during World War II, he later became an
attorney, opening a general practice in Findlay.

When incumbent Representative Ralph Cole was appointed to a judicial seat for the state Court of Appeals, Schuck was appointed to replace him.  He subsequently won election to a full term in 1968.  He won reelection in 1970. When redistricting occurred in 1973, Schuck's district was eliminated, and after two terms, he left office.

After leaving the legislature, Schuck went on to serve as city prosecutor along with returning to private practice.  He retired in 1994, after over forty years of practice.  He died in 2003.

References

1917 births
Republican Party members of the Ohio House of Representatives
2003 deaths
United States Army personnel of World War II
Ohio lawyers
20th-century American politicians
20th-century American lawyers